Sumon Saha (born 10 April 1984) is a first-class cricketer from Bangladesh. Born in Sirajganj District, he is a right arm fast medium bowler and tail end right-handed batsman.  He made his debut for Rajshahi Division in 2004/05 and played through the 2006/07 season.  His best bowling, a haul of 6 for 81, came against Barisal Division and he took another five wicket haul against Dhaka Division.

References

Bangladeshi cricketers
Rajshahi Division cricketers
Barisal Division cricketers
Sylhet Division cricketers
1984 births
Living people